The Whangdoodle Entertainers, sometimes referred to as the Whangdoodle Trio, Whangdoodle Quartet, Whangdoodle Quintet, Whangdoodle Orchestra, and Whangdoodle Ensemble was an American jazz and ragtime band formed in Seattle, Washington. They routinely performed throughout the Seattle area from approximately 1907–1925.

The Entertainers (trio, quartet, quintet, orchestra, or ensemble) 
Although members of the group rotated, along with the name of the group, the manager was "Ace" Brooks of Seattle, Washington.

The first mention of the Whangdoodle Four occurs in a newspaper announcement in The Seattle Republican at the end of 1907. A brief 1909 article in the Freeman: An Illustrated Colored Newspaper lists the members of the Whangdoodle Trio as P. G. Lowery, first mandolin; F.R. Brooks, manager, second mandolin; J.P. Faulkner, tenor, cello; F.E. Lowry, baritone, harp, guitar; and H.E. Mables, bass. 

A photo of the Whangdoodle Entertainers, from The Freeman newspaper, 1914, lists the members as C.A. Hughes, H.T. Hollie, F.D. Waldron, F.R. Brooks, and Coddy J. Jones. The Whangdoodle Entertainers performed ragtime, string band music, and jazz.

Members 

 F.R., Frank "Ace" Brooks: Popular musician, vocalist, and comedian who toured the country. Manager of the Whangdoodle Entertainers. Before forming the Whangdoodlers, Brooks performed with the Sherrah Quartette which was part of a circus sideshow in 1900 and 1901 under P.G. Lowery's management. A note in the February 16, 1901 edition of The Freeman states, "F.R. Brooks, better known as the "Easy going ace," keeps the house in a continuous uproar all the time he is on the stage. He is naturally one of the funniest comedians in the business."
 Coddy (Coty) J. Jones
P. G. Lowery: A touring musician, entrepreneur, and band leader, who was referred to as, "The world's greatest colored cornet soloist."
C.A. Hughes
H.T. Hollie
J.P. Faulkner
F.E. Lowry
H.E. Mables
 Frank D. Waldron: (1890-1955) A jazz cornetist, alto saxophonist, trumpeter, composer, bandleader, and music teacher who lived in Seattle, Washington.

Notes

References

External Links 
 Photo of Wang Doodle Orchestra  held by the Black Heritage Society of Washington.
 

American jazz ensembles from Washington (state)
Musical groups from Seattle